Melvyn I. Weiss (August 1, 1935 – February 2, 2018) was an American attorney who co-founded plaintiff class action law firm Milberg Weiss.

Early life and education
Born in The Bronx, Weiss grew up in Hollis Hills, Queens and attended Jamaica High School. After graduating from City College of New York in 1956, he graduated three years later with a law degree from New York University School of Law. He served in the United States Army.

Bribery charges and incarceration
At one point Weiss and his law firm dominated the market in securities class-action suits, in which investors who suffer losses typically claim that executives had misled them about a company's financial condition.

On March 20, 2008, Weiss announced through his attorney that he would plead guilty to making illegal client kickbacks in exchange for an 18- to 33-month prison sentence and fines and restitution of $10 million.

Prior to his sentencing for what he admitted was "wrongful  conduct," and for which he was "profoundly sorry," supporters had flooded the Federal court with over 275 letters detailing Weiss' philanthropic history, including his pro bono work resulting in $6.25 billion in settlements he helped win for Holocaust victims. Both the Federal judge hearing the case and U.S. Attorney called the support for Weiss "unprecedented."

Weiss was sentenced to 30 months of incarceration on Monday June 2, 2008. He served half of his sentence at the minimum security Federal Correctional Institution in Morgantown, West Virginia, with the remainder served under home confinement.

Death
Weiss died on February 2, 2018, at his home in Boca Raton, Florida.  He had been suffering from Amyotrophic lateral sclerosis (ALS).

See also
William Lerach

References

1935 births
2018 deaths
Disbarred American lawyers
New York (state) lawyers
City College of New York alumni
New York University School of Law alumni
People from the Bronx
People from Boca Raton, Florida
Military personnel from New York City
Jewish American attorneys
Neurological disease deaths in Florida
Deaths from motor neuron disease
20th-century American lawyers
21st-century American Jews